St Mary Hill is a settlement in the Vale of Glamorgan, Wales. It is part of the community of Llangan along with Treoes and the village of Llangan itself.

History
In the Middle Ages St Mary Hill was located partly within two manors, Gelligarn and Ruthin. Gelligarn, known historically as Kilticar, belonged to the De Alweias (De Haweys) during the 12th century.  The De Alweias held the manor under the Le Sores of St Fagans, before it switched ownership to Neath Abbey during the reign of Henry II. The lordship of Ruthin, of which Gelligarn once formed part, contained the medieval parish church, known locally in the Welsh language as Eglwys Fair y Mynydd to distinguish it from a second St Mary Church located in Llanfair, also in the Vale of Glamorgan.

Notes

Bibliography

External links
Google maps

Villages in the Vale of Glamorgan
Hamlets in Wales